Nguyễn Bính (Vụ Bản 1918 – Nam Định 1966) was a Vietnamese poet. A committed supporter of the August Revolution he moved to the resistance base in Đồng Tháp Mười leading a literature and arts unit. Later he was editor of the semi-independent poetry magazine Trăm hoa, Hundred Flowers.

References

Vietnamese male poets
1918 births
1966 deaths
20th-century Vietnamese poets
20th-century male writers